Toxicopueraria is a genus of flowering plants belonging to the family Fabaceae.

Its native range is Pakistan to Southern China and Northern Indo-China.

Species:
 Toxicopueraria peduncularis (Benth.) A.N.Egan & B.Pan 
 Toxicopueraria yunnanensis (Franch.) A.N.Egan & B.Pan

References

Fabaceae
Fabaceae genera